The Speedway Champions Cup was an annual motorcycle speedway event held each year organized by the International Motorcycling Federation (FIM) between 1986 and 1993.

This competition featured the national champions of the top sixteen countries. It was held to give smaller speedway nations their own "World Final", but was scrapped with the introduction of the Speedway Grand Prix in 1995.

Previous winners

See also
 track racing
 Individual Speedway European Championship

References

 
European Speedway Championships